The 2018 LEN Super Cup was the 37th edition of the LEN Super Cup, an annual water polo match organised by LEN and contested by the reigning champions of the two main European club competitions, the top-tier LEN Champions League and the second-tier LEN Euro Cup. The match was played between European champions Olympiacos, the winners of the 2017–18 LEN Champions League, and Ferencváros, the winners of the 2017–18 LEN Euro Cup.

It was played at the Császár-Komjádi Swimming Stadium in Budapest, Hungary, on 30 November 2018.

Teams

Squads

Head coach: Thodoris Vlachos

Head coach: Zsolt Varga

Match

References

External links
 LEN Super Cup at microplustiming.com

LEN Super Cup
2018 in water polo